John Alexander was the defending champion, but lost in the first round this year.

Johan Kriek won the title, defeating Tom Gullikson 7–6, 7–5 in the final.

Seeds

  Johan Kriek (champion)
  Hank Pfister (second round)
  Brian Teacher (quarterfinals)
  Mark Edmondson (first round)
  Tim Mayotte (first round)
  John Alexander (first round)
  Marcos Hocevar (quarterfinals)
  Mark Dickson (first round)

Draw

Finals

Top half

Bottom half

External links
 Main draw

1983 Grand Prix (tennis)
1983 Bristol Open